August Julius Casse Schou (1903–1984) was a Norwegian historian.

He was born in Christiania, and was a brother of Aage Casse Schou. He was director of the Norwegian Nobel Institute and secretary of the Norwegian Nobel Committee from 1946 to 1973.

References

1903 births
1984 deaths
Writers from Oslo
20th-century Norwegian historians